The 2023 Primera División season, officially Liga de Fútbol Profesional Venezolano or Liga FUTVE, is the 67th season of the Venezuelan Primera División, the top-flight football league in Venezuela, and the 42nd season since the start of the professional era. The season began on 3 February 2023.

Metropolitanos are the defending champions.

Format
The competition format for this season was announced by the Liga FUTVE on 31 January 2023. Similar to the previous season, the 15 participating clubs will take part in a double round-robin first stage in which they will play each other twice (once at home and once away) for a total of 28 games. The top four clubs, which will qualify for the 2024 Copa Libertadores, will also advance to a final stage where they will play each other twice with the top two teams playing a single-legged final to decide the league champions. However, and unlike the previous season, no final stage to decide the teams qualified for the 2024 Copa Sudamericana will be played, with the four berths to that competition instead being awarded to the teams placing 5th to 8th in the first stage. No teams will be directly relegated to Segunda División, as the last-placed team in the first stage will play a relegation playoff against the runners-up of the second tier competition.

Teams
16 teams were expected to compete in the 2023 season, subject to the fulfillment of club licensing requirements: the top 15 teams in the first stage of the 2022 season as well as the 2022 Segunda División champions Angostura, who defeated Academia Anzoátegui in the Segunda División final on 16 October 2022. They will replace Aragua, who were relegated to Segunda División at the end of the previous season after finishing in bottom place.

On 12 December 2022, it was announced that Zulia and Segunda División side Deportivo Rayo Zuliano would merge, with the latter taking the former's place in the league. The merger was officially confirmed on 28 January 2023, with which Rayo Zuliano will compete in the top flight for the first time ever in this season. Furthermore, two days later it was confirmed that Deportivo Lara will not take part in the season, ultimately bringing the number of participating teams down to 15.

{|

|}

Stadia and locations

Personnel and kits

Managerial changes

First stage
The first stage started on 3 February and is scheduled to end on 1 October 2023.

Standings

Results

Top goalscorers

{| class="wikitable" style="text-align:center"
! Rank
! Player
! Club
! Goals
|-
|1
|align="left"| Luifer Hernández
|align="left"|Academia Puerto Cabello
|5
|-
|rowspan=5|2
|align="left"| Richard Blanco
|align="left"|Mineros de Guayana
|rowspan=5|4
|-
|align="left"| Franklin González
|align="left"|Hermanos Colmenarez
|-
|align="left"| Saúl Guarirapa
|align="left"|Caracas
|-
|align="left"| Junior Paredes
|align="left"|Estudiantes de Mérida
|-
|align="left"| Danny Pérez
|align="left"|Academia Puerto Cabello
|-
|rowspan=3|7
|align="left"| Edson Castillo
|align="left"|Monagas
|rowspan=3|3
|-
|align="left"| Edder Farías
|align="left"|Deportivo Táchira
|-
|align="left"| Santiago Herrera
|align="left"|Monagas
|}
Source: Soccerway

References

External links
  of the Venezuelan Football Federation 
 Liga FUTVE

Venezuela
Venezuelan Primera División seasons
Ven
1